Ángel Salazar (born March 2, 1956) is a Cuban-American comedian and actor. He is known internationally for saying "Sheck it out" (check it out) before, during, and after jokes. He also co-starred with Tom Hanks in the film Punchline, and with Al Pacino in Scarface (as the character "Chi Chi") and Carlito's Way (as the character "Walberto"). Salazar has also appeared on Last Comic Standing and many HBO Comedy specials.

Filmography

References

External links

1956 births
American entertainers of Cuban descent
Living people